The Linwood Public Schools are a comprehensive community public school district that serves students in pre-kindergarten through eighth grade from Linwood, in Atlantic County, New Jersey, United States.

As of the 2020–21 school year, the district, comprised of two schools, had an enrollment of 809 students and 71.0 classroom teachers (on an FTE basis), for a student–teacher ratio of 11.4:1.

The district is classified by the New Jersey Department of Education as being in District Factor Group "GH", the third-highest of eight groupings. District Factor Groups organize districts statewide to allow comparison by common socioeconomic characteristics of the local districts. From lowest socioeconomic status to highest, the categories are A, B, CD, DE, FG, GH, I and J.

Students in public school for ninth through twelfth grades attend Mainland Regional High School, which also serves students from Northfield and Somers Point. The high school is located in Linwood. For the 1997–98 school year, Mainland Regional High School was recognized by the United States Department of Education as a National Blue Ribbon School. As of the 2020–21 school year, the high school had an enrollment of 1,239 students and 108.0 classroom teachers (on an FTE basis), for a student–teacher ratio of 11.5:1.

Awards and recognition
During the 2008–09 school year, Seaview Elementary School was recognized with the National Blue Ribbon Schools Program Award of Excellence by the United States Department of Education, the highest award an American school can receive.

The district was selected as one of the top "100 Best Communities for Music Education in America 2006" by the American Music Conference.

Schools
Schools in the district (with 2020–21 enrollment data from the National Center for Education Statistics) are:
Elementary school
Seaview Elementary School with 429 students in grades PreK-4
Lori Care, Principal
Middle school
Belhaven Middle School with 378 students in grades 5-8
Dr. Jennifer Luff, Principal

Activities
Belhaven hosts a series of events throughout the year, including the Pep Rally, the People's Choice Awards, and the Blue and Gold Game. In the Pep Rally, every grade level puts on an act, and kids and teachers are presented awards for their outstanding achievement. In the People's Choice Awards, students get picked from their grade level teachers based on their achievements. In the Blue and Gold Game, the Blue (newer) teachers play basketball against the Gold (older) teachers, with each side including some eighth graders.

Administration
Core members of the district's administration are:
Brian M. Pruitt, Superintendent
Kevin Byrnes, Business Administrator / Board Secretary

Board of education
The district's board of education is comprised of nine members who set policy and oversee the fiscal and educational operation of the district through its administration. As a Type II school district, the board's trustees are elected directly by voters to serve three-year terms of office on a staggered basis, with three seats up for election each year held (since 2017) as part of the November general election. The board appoints a superintendent to oversee the district's day-to-day operations and a business administrator to supervise the business functions of the district.

In the November 2016 general election, voters approved a referendum changing the district from an appointed (Type I) school board to a (Type II) board elected by voters.

References

External links
Linwood Public Schools

School Data for the Linwood Public Schools, National Center for Education Statistics
Mainland Regional High School website

Linwood, New Jersey
New Jersey District Factor Group GH
School districts in Atlantic County, New Jersey